Sarah-Jane Honeywell (born 5 January 1974) is an English actress, writer, TV and radio presenter, blogger and singer. She is best known for her work on the CBeebies television channel.

As well as appearing on pre-school TV, Honeywell is a supporter of Bristol City F.C. and writes a regular column in the Ashton Gate Stadium match day programme 'Well Red'. Honeywell  is a vegan, and does charity work for Dogs Trust. Fairies being her website and personal symbol, she also has a fairy-wings tattoo.

In December 2006, Honeywell released an EP titled Love and Magic. The second track "Believe in Magic" was released as a single, and the music video was made at the annual Goose Fair in Nottingham, 2007. A Sarah-Jane plush doll was released to coincide with the EP. The songs from the EP featured in the CBeebies Live tour and the production of Peter Pan at the Capitol Theatre, Horsham.

In April 2021, Sarah-Jane joined BBC Radio Lincolnshire, presenting a weekly music show every Sunday afternoon.

Biography

Early career
When Honeywell was young she went to dance school and gymnastics classes. She completed her education at Ordsall Hall School. At 18, she got her first job, working in Malta as a contortionist for three months, having trained with acrobatic troupe the Great Kovaks in Doncaster. At 19, she moved to London to play the part of a kitten in Cats, and from musical theatre moved into television.

Later career
Honeywell has acted in several leading theatre productions including The Little Mermaid at the Alban Arena, Peter Pan at Southend, Woking, Southampton, Wimbledon and Horsham, the 2004–05 and 2006–07 CBEEBIES Live! National Arena Tours and the Fimbles National Tour 2006. She also appeared in Falstaff at the Royal Opera House, has played a wide range of characters in television dramas and commercials, and continues to do aerial and skin work. She has also performed a solo show "Love & Magic" at venues across the UK and Europe and appeared in an independent film called Shadows of a Stranger (2014).

In August 2011, her "wholesome" image came under scrutiny when she controversially appeared on celebrity photographer Marc de Groot's Facebook page, pouring Diet Coke over an almost see-through vest and posing wearing candyfloss "underwear". Three months later, she posed topless for PETA to mark World Vegan Day. "Going vegan is the best decision I've ever made – I have tons of energy, and I know that I'm not contributing to animal suffering", Honeywell said. "A vegan diet is good for your health, for the environment and for animals – and there's no better time to switch than on World Vegan Day!" Honeywell said in December 2021 that she believed it was this photoshoot that led to her being let go from CBeebies.

Honeywell completed a dance album with record producer Dave DMello that was released in April 2012.

Honeywell was an additional puppeteer on the 2019 Netflix series The Dark Crystal: Age of Resistance.

Personal life
On 17 May 2015, Honeywell and her fiancé, Hollyoaks actor Ayden Callaghan, announced they were expecting their first child. Their son, Phoenix, was born on 25 August 2015. 
Honeywell and Callaghan were then married on 17 October 2016. They announced on 5 September 2017 that they were expecting their second child and another son, Indiana was born on 24 January 2018.

Honeywell blogs about her life as a mother as honeymumster. Despite her vegan views, she decided not to raise her children as vegan, stating in an interview on Good Morning Britain in March 2019: "I don't want to put my views on my children. I don't think you should put your religious, dietary or political views on your children, I think we have children to guide them to their own destinations, not my destination [...] but I will tell them the truth [when] they're ready, and then they can make their own decisions". Honeywell's husband Callaghan eats meat.

Notable appearances

References

External links
 The official Sarah-Jane Honeywell website

1974 births
Living people
20th-century English actresses
21st-century English actresses
Actresses from Nottinghamshire
British women television presenters
Contortionists
English women singers
English musical theatre actresses
English television actresses
English television presenters
Musicians from Nottinghamshire
People from Worksop